Adalbert Wirz (16 June 1848 – 14 September 1925) was a Swiss politician and President of the Swiss Council of States (1906/1907).

External links 
 
 

1848 births
1925 deaths
People from Obwalden
Swiss Roman Catholics
Christian Democratic People's Party of Switzerland politicians
Members of the Council of States (Switzerland)
Presidents of the Council of States (Switzerland)